The 1934 Penn Quakers football team was an American football team that represented the University of Pennsylvania as an independent during the 1934 college football season. In its fourth season under head coach Harvey Harman, the team compiled a 4–4 record and outscored opponents by a total of 118 to 83. The team played its home games at Franklin Field in Philadelphia.

Schedule

References

Penn
Penn Quakers football seasons
Penn Quakers football